Tony Roche defeated Rod Laver 6–1, 6–4, 4–6, 6–3 to win the 1969 New Zealand Open singles event. Barry Phillips-Moore was the champion but did not defend his title.

Seeds
Champion seeds are indicated in bold text while text in italics indicates the round in which those seeds were eliminated.

Draw

Finals

References

ATP Auckland Open